Procharista is a genus of moth in the family Lecithoceridae.

Species
 Procharista ranongensis Park, 2009
 Procharista sardonias Meyrick, 1922
 Procharista spectabilosa Park, 2009

References

 
Lecithocerinae
Moth genera